Manouchehr Azmoun (September 29, 1930 – April 9, 1979) was a member of the 24th National Assembly, Minister of Labor and Social Affairs in Amir-Abbas Hoveyda Cabinet, Governor of Fars in the cabinet of Jamshid Amouzegar and then Minister of State in the Cabinet of Jafar Sharif Emami. He was executed on 9 April 1979. He held a PhD in Political Economy and Social Sciences from the University of Cologne, Germany.

Arrest and execution
Azmoun was arrest in 7 November 1978 by the Shah order and he remain in Prison until 11 February 1979 when Bakhtiar resigned he was arrest again in 13 February 1979 by Khomeini order. he was charge in Corruption of the god he was executed in 9 April 1979 in Qasr Prison with Air Forces Chief, Amir Hossein Rabii, IV Department of Army director, Ali Mohammad Khajeh Nouri and policeman

References 

Rastakhiz Party politicians
1930 births
1979 deaths
Members of the 24th Iranian Majlis
Government ministers of Iran
Executed Iranian people
University of Cologne alumni